The Bais City National Science High School is a Secondary Public Science high school system located in Bais, Negros Oriental, Philippines. It is a DepEd-recognized science high school.

Science high schools in the Philippines
High schools in Negros Oriental